Finnish composer Einojuhani Rautavaara wrote his Symphony No. 8, subtitled The Journey, in 1999. The total playing time is approximately 28 minutes.

Movements
Adagio assai - Andante assai
Feroce -
Tranquillo
Con grandezza - Sciolto - Tempo I

Instrumentation
Piccolo, 2 flutes, 2 oboes, English horn, 2 clarinets in B flat, bass clarinet, 2 bassoons, contrabassoon, 4 horns in F, 4 trumpets in C, 3 trombones, tuba, timpani, vibraphone, xylophone, glockenspiel, tubular bells, 4 tom-toms, cymbal (suspended), gong (30"), 3 tam-tams, 2 harps, strings.

Premiere
Philadelphia Orchestra / Wolfgang Sawallisch, April 27, 2000

Recordings

Rautavaara's symphony has been recorded four times since 1999.

Compositions by Einojuhani Rautavaara
1999 compositions
Rautavaara 8